was a Japanese painter and woodblock print designer of the late 19th and early 20th centuries, part of the shin-hanga ("new prints") movement.

Ohara Koson was famous as a master of kachō-e (bird-and-flower) designs. Throughout a prolific career, in which he created around 500 prints, he went by three different titles: Ohara Hōson (小原豊邨), Ohara Shōson (小原祥邨) and Ohara Koson.

Biography 
He was born Ohara Matao; it is thought that he started training in painting and design at the Ishikawa Prefecture Technical School in 1889–1893. He also studied painting with Suzuki Kason (1860–1919), although accounts differ on whether this happened during his school years or after he moved to Tokyo in the middle to late 1890s.

In Tokyo, he produced some ukiyo-e triptychs illustrating episodes of the Russo-Japanese War, but most of his production was prints of birds-and-flowers (kachō-e). He worked at first with publishers Akiyama Buemon (Kokkeidō) and Matsuki Heikichi (Daikokuya), signing his work Koson. Starting around 1926, he became associated with the publisher Watanabe Shōzaburō, and signed his work Shōson. He also worked with the publisher Kawaguchi, signing his works Hōson.

Through his association with Watanabe, Ohara's work was exhibited abroad, and his prints sold well, particularly in the United States. He was active designing prints until at least 1935, and died at his home in Tokyo in 1945.

His work is held in several museums worldwide, including the Toledo Museum of Art, the Brooklyn Museum, the British Museum, the University of Michigan Museum of Art, the Museum of Fine Arts, Boston, the Harvard Art Museums, the Rijksmuseum, the Carnegie Museum of Art, the Saint Louis Art Museum, the Indianapolis Museum of Art, the Museum of New Zealand, the Museum of Anthropology at the University of British Columbia, the Birmingham Museum of Art, the John and Mable Ringling Museum of Art, and the Clark Art Institute.

The Manggha museum in Krakow, Poland held a large retrospective in 2021 from the collection of Romanian musical artist Adrian Ciceu, brother of Eugen Cicero.

References

 Amy Reigle Newland, Jan Perree & Robert Schaap. Koson Ohara - Amsterdam Rijksmuseum, "Crows, Cranes & Camellias. The Natural World of Ohara Koson 1877-1945. Japanese Prints from the Jan Perree Collection". Leiden: Hotei Publishing, 2001. .

Gallery

External links

Koson Ohara prints

Ukiyo-e
1877 births
1945 deaths
People from Kanazawa, Ishikawa
Shin hanga artists
20th-century Japanese painters
20th-century printmakers
Bird artists